Asura avernalis is a moth of the  family Erebidae. It is found on the Solomon Islands and Bougainville Island.

References

avernalis
Moths described in 1887
Moths of Oceania